John Houghton was an association football player who represented New Zealand.

Houghton made his full All Whites debut as a substitute in a 2–4 loss to New Caledonia on 18 July 1971 and ended his international playing career with 15 A-international caps and 2 goals to his credit, his final cap being an appearance in a 1–1 draw with Australia on 30 March 1977.

References 

Year of birth missing (living people)
Living people
New Zealand association footballers
New Zealand international footballers
Association football defenders